Matías Moroni (born 29 March 1991) is an Argentine rugby union player who plays as a centre and wing for Newcastle Falcons and the Argentina national rugby union team. He previously played for Argentina's Jaguares in Super Rugby and Leicester Tigers.  He was a Premiership Rugby champion in 2022 with Leicester.

Career

Moroni played his youth in Los Molinos and the Club Universitario de Buenos Aires.

Moroni signed for Leicester Tigers in Premiership Rugby for the 2020–21 Premiership Rugby season.  He settled in quickly playing 10 of 13 games and making a positive impression, he scored his first try for Leicester against Connacht in a European Rugby Challenge Cup round of 16 game.

Moroni was recognised as a defensive lynchpin for Leicester, starting the 2022 Premiership Rugby final which Leicester won 15-12.

He was then announced as a new signing for Newcastle Falcons on 22 June 2022.

International career

Moroni was a member of the Argentina Under-20 side which competed in the 2011 IRB Junior World Championship, he also represented the Pumas sevens team in 13 competitions during 2012 and 2013 and was selected by the Pampas XV for their 2014 tour of Oceania.

Moroni made his senior debut for Los Pumas on 20 June 2014 against  in Córdoba.

Moroni competed at the 2016 Summer Olympics for the Argentina national rugby sevens team.

References

External links
 
 
 
 
 
 

1991 births
Living people
Argentine people of Italian descent
Rugby union centres
Argentine rugby union players
Argentina international rugby union players
Pampas XV players
Male rugby sevens players
Rugby union players from Buenos Aires
Argentina international rugby sevens players
Club Universitario de Buenos Aires rugby union players
Jaguares (Super Rugby) players
Rugby sevens players at the 2016 Summer Olympics
Olympic rugby sevens players of Argentina
Leicester Tigers players